Michal Novák may refer to:

 Michal Novák (ice hockey), Slovak ice hockey player
 Michal Novák (skier), Czech cross-country skier